McGlinchy is a surname. Notable people with the surname include:

Kevin McGlinchy (born 1977), American baseball player
Sean McGlinchy (born 1992), Northern Ireland boxer
Tobias McGlinchy Hill (1915–1977), New Zealand sailor and trade unionist

See also
McGlinchey